Rhyzodiastes bipunctatus is a species of ground beetle in the subfamily Rhysodinae. It was described by R.T. & J.R. Bell in 1985. It is found on Guadalcanal (Solomon Islands).

References

Rhyzodiastes
Beetles of Oceania
Insects of the Solomon Islands
Endemic fauna of the Solomon Islands
Beetles described in 1985